Sueviota  tubicola, the tubeworm dwarfgoby, is a species of fish in the family Gobiidae. from Papua New Guinea.This species reaches a length of .

References

tubicola
Taxa named by Gerald R. Allen
Taxa named by Mark van Nydeck Erdmann
Fish described in 2017
Fish of Papua New Guinea